Randall Darius Jackson (born June 23, 1956) is an American musician, record executive and television presenter, perhaps best known as a judge on American Idol from 2002 to 2013.

Jackson began his career in the 1980s as a session musician playing bass guitar for an array of jazz, pop, rock, and R&B performers. He moved on to work in music production and in the A&R department at Columbia Records and MCA Records. Jackson is best known from his appearances as the longest-serving judge on American Idol and executive producer for MTV's America's Best Dance Crew.

In May 2020, Jackson was rehired as bassist for Journey following their sudden split with founding member Ross Valory. Jackson had previously filled the role on the band's 1986 album Raised on Radio and its tour.

Early life
Jackson was born June 23, 1956, in Baton Rouge, Louisiana, the son of Julia, a homemaker, and Herman Jackson, a plant foreman. He graduated from Southern University in 1979 with a bachelor's degree in music.

Music career

In the early 1980s, he played on three albums for Jean-Luc Ponty and with the rock band Taxxi. From 1986 to 1987, he was a session musician for the rock group Journey. He played on Journey's 1986 album Raised on Radio. He moved to Italy in the late 1980s and played on a record by Italian pop star Zucchero. The record, Zucchero and the Randy Jackson Band, was produced by Corrado Rustici who played guitar with Jackson on many albums in the early 1980s.  

In 1985, Keith Richards was asked to provide music for the Whoopi Goldberg comedy vehicle Jumpin' Jack Flash. Richards assembled an all-star band which included Aretha Franklin on piano and lead vocals and Jackson on bass guitar. This song was the fourth track on Aretha's 1986 album titled Aretha. Jackson can be seen in the song's video.
In the late 1980s, Jackson was still doing sessions. He was notably on the first solo album by famed session guitarist Steve Lukather. Jackson was a featured bass guitarist on five songs on Maze's 1989 "Silky Soul" album. He also performed on several of Kenny G's albums.

Jackson was the bass guitarist on the 1991 self-titled Divinyls album (which features the song "I Touch Myself") as well as featured bassist on several tracks of Tracy Chapman's 1992 release, Matters of the Heart. He performed on the singles "Bang Bang Bang", "Open Arms", and "Dreaming on a World". That same year, Jackson also played bass on Bruce Springsteen's song "Human Touch". 

On March 11, 2008, Jackson released an album produced entirely by himself, titled Randy Jackson's Music Club, Vol. 1. The album's release was preceded by the single "Dance Like There's No Tomorrow" sung by Paula Abdul. In 2009, Randy began working with former Idol finalist Kimberley Locke, producing her 4th album. The lead single, "Strobe Light", was released March 16, 2010. In February 2010, Jackson participated in We Are the World 25 for Haiti as part of the chorus. 

Jackson is the manager for the Charlotte-based band Paper Tongues. With the help of Jackson, they signed with a major label, A&M/Octone Records. He has also worked as an executive, spending eight years as vice president of artists and repertoire (A&R) at Columbia Records and four years heading A&R at MCA Records.

Radio program
Jackson also hosts a radio top 40 countdown known as Randy Jackson's Hit List, which is syndicated by Westwood One. Every week, Jackson counts down his top 30 Urban AC and Mainstream AC hits. He also gives behind-the-scenes information on American Idol on the internet radio station Artist Underground.

Television

American Idol
Starting in 2002, Jackson was one of the panel judges on the Fox Network reality television series American Idol, along with Paula Abdul (2002–2009), Simon Cowell (2002–2010), Kara DioGuardi (2009–2010), Ellen DeGeneres (2010), Jennifer Lopez (2011–2012), Steven Tyler (2011–2012), Nicki Minaj (2013), Mariah Carey (2013), and Keith Urban (2013). As a result of Cowell's departure, Jackson was left as the sole original judge on American Idol. His role was originally going to be reduced to that of a mentor, so the 2013 season would have all new judges, but it was later decided that he would remain as a judge for season 12. On May 9, 2013, Jackson announced that he would be leaving American Idol after twelve seasons due to him wanting to focus on other business ventures. On September 3, 2013, it was announced that Jackson would replace Jimmy Iovine as the in-house mentor on American Idol. He departed the series for good in November 2014.

America's Best Dance Crew
Jackson produced America's Best Dance Crew, an American group dance competition and reality television show, which premiered on February 7, 2008, on MTV and was cancelled in 2012 due to declining ratings. Each week, the teams showcased their creative talents in choreography and their dance skills, and one crew was eliminated by the judges. The competition continued until the sole winning dance crew was awarded the title of America's Best Dance Crew, and a cash prize of $100,000.

Name That Tune
Jackson serves as bandleader on the revival of Name That Tune.

Personal life 

Jackson's first marriage, to Elizabeth Jackson, was dissolved in 1990; they had one daughter named Taylor. In 1995, Jackson married Erika Riker, with whom he has two children, a daughter named Zoe and a son named Jordan. In 2014, Riker filed for divorce citing irreconcilable differences; it was finalized in 2019.

In 2003, Jackson lost  following gastric bypass surgery. He stated in a February 2008 television commercial that he has type 2 diabetes.

Discography

Albums

Singles

As sideman
With Journey
Frontiers (Columbia, 1983) (bass on "After the Fall")
Raised on Radio (Columbia, 1986)
Freedom (BMG, 2022)
With Richard Marx
Repeat Offender (Capitol, 1989)
With Neal Schon
Late Nite (Columbia, 1989)
With Jean-Luc Ponty
Civilized Evil (Atlantic, 1980)
Mystical Adventures (Atlantic, 1982)
Individual Choice (Atlantic, 1983)

With Stryper
Against the Law (Enigma, 1990) (bass on "Shining Star")

References

External links

Randy Jackson's Hit List from Westwood One

1956 births
Living people
American Idol participants
American male singers
American music managers
American radio personalities
American rock bass guitarists
American session musicians
A&R people
Columbia Records artists
Journey (band) members
Singers from Louisiana
Musicians from Baton Rouge, Louisiana
American jazz bass guitarists
American male bass guitarists
American rhythm and blues bass guitarists
American male guitarists
Guitarists from Louisiana
20th-century American guitarists
Jazz musicians from Louisiana
Record producers from Louisiana
American male jazz musicians
Southern University alumni
People with type 2 diabetes
Judges in American reality television series